Mount Santubong is a mountain in the Malaysian state of Sarawak. It is located about 35 km north of the state capital Kuching.

Biological importance 
In 1855 a British naturalist, Alfred Russel Wallace who was staying at Santubong while collecting specimens in Sarawak, wrote a paper while called "Sarawak Law"  which can be considered as a precursor to the biological theory of evolution.

Ascent 
Mount Santubong lies within a gazetted national park of the same name. Entry to the park is now via the temporary Sarawak Forestry Corporation park headquarter entrance. The issue of custodian of park entry has now been put to rest by the relevant authorities

History 

Mount Santubong's name is derived from indigenous Dyak Iban  means coffin. Investigators have made ascents of the steep mountain to find places of archaeological interest. Around its foot are old Hindu occupation which are hundreds of years old which have been investigated by the Sarawak Museum . It was also the home of the early Sarawak Malays until they were driven up to Kuching in about the 1850s owing to continual attacks from the powerful Saribas Dayaks.

The mountain is assumed to have been thrown straight up from the sea following some volcanic eruption probably millions of years ago. For a long time it interested those in search of gold but without success. There used to be an old theory that all the gold in the First Division of Sarawak lies in a straight line between Bau and Santubong which proved correct.

It is thought that the volcanic eruption which threw Mount Santubong up out of the sea, also threw up the earth and scattered the gold deposits in the area which explains why no large deposits have yet been found.

However, there is a certain amount of gold in the mountain since fishermen in the past used to depend for their livelihood during the landas season, when the sea was too rough for fishing, by panning gold in the small mountain streams from which they could expect to gain an average of twenty dollars a month.

In popular culture
The legend of Mount Santubong is the subject of a song, Puteri Santubong, which was composed and originally sang by Haji Madzhi Johari in 1974-1975. The song became popular after former Information Minister, the late Tan Sri Mohamed Rahmat proposed that folk songs from all the states be compiled and broadcast almost every day through Radio Televisyen Malaysia radio and television channels.

References

Further reading 
 National Parks of Sarawak, by Hans P. Hazebroek, Abang Kashim bin Abang Morshidi. .
 The Encyclopedia of Malaysia, .
  On the Law Which Has Regulated the Introduction of New Species.
 AR Wallace travelog to Borneo and the Malay World.

External links 
 Satellite image from Google Earth
 Sarawak Tourism page on the mountain
 A song about the two princesses, with translations

Santubong